Francesco Scarpinato (Palermo, August 11, 1840 - December 27, 1895 ) was an Italian painter.

Scarpinato was a prolific painter of genre scenes and vedute of his native Sicily. He had success at exhibitions, including in 1877 Venice, with an oil canvas depicting: A Rustic Shabby House. In Turin, in 1880: Il Villaggio; La Spiaggia della Colonetfa and Tramonto, exhibited at the 1883 Milanese Mostra of Fine Arts. The same year at the Exposition of Rome: Sicilian Countryside; A Courtyard; and A Morning in Palermo. The latter canvas was exhibited at the Exposition of Turin in 1884.  In 1886 at Livorno, he displayed; Last Rays and Tramonto in Sicily. The next year in Venice: Era l'ora del desìo.

References

19th-century Italian painters
Italian male painters
1840 births
1895 deaths
Painters from Palermo
Italian genre painters
19th-century Italian male artists